Paramjit Singh may refer to:

 Paramjit Singh (artist) (born 1935), Indian artist
 Paramjit Singh (basketball) (born 1952), Indian basketball player 
 Paramjit Singh (sprinter) (born 1971), Indian athlete
 Paramjit Singh, titular successor to Jagatjit Singh (1872–1949) as Maharajah of Kapurthala

See also 
 Parmjit Singh (disambiguation)